Ženski Košarkaški Klub Trešnjevka 2009 is a Croatian women's basketball club from Zagreb currently playing in the First League of Croatia. Its major success was winning the Ronchetti Cup in 1980 beating Maritsa Plovdiv in the final; it was the only Yugoslav team that won the competition. It also reached the final in 1976 and 1981, but lost to Slavia Prague and Spartak Moscow. Following the break-up of Yugoslavia it won three national cups between 1993 and 1996 and the national championship in 1999, remaining a regular in the Ronchetti Cup's preliminary rounds through the decade.

History

Names in history
Trešnjevka (–1970)
Industromontaža (1970–1978)
Monting (1978–1988)
Montmontaža (1988–2009)
Trešnjevka 2009 (2009–present)

Arena

Honours

Domestic
National Championships – 4

First League of SFR Yugoslavia:
Winners (3) : 1967, 1982, 1983
Runners-up (8): 1963, 1966, 1976, 1979, 1980, 1981, 1984, 1985
First League of Croatia:
Winners (1) : 1999
Runners-up (8): 1992, 1993, 1995, 1996, 2000, 2002, 2017, 2018

National Cups – 7

Cup of SFR Yugoslavia:
Winners (4) : 1975, 1978, 1980, 1982
Runners-up (6): 1962, 1976, 1979, 1981, 1984, 1986
Cup of Croatia:
Winners (3) : 1993, 1994, 1996
Runners-up (5): 1992, 1995, 1999, 2014, 2017

International
International titles – 1

Ronchetti Cup:
Winners (1) : 1980
Runners-up (2): 1976, 1981

Current roster

Notable former players

Notable former coaches

External links
Official website
Official page at Facebook
 Profile at eurobasket.com
Profile at fibaeurope.com

Sports teams in Zagreb
Women's basketball teams in Croatia
Women's basketball teams in Yugoslavia
Basketball teams established in 1937